The Stjarnan men's football team is the men's football department of the Ungmennafélagið Stjarnan multi-sport club. It is based in Garðabær, Iceland, and currently plays in the Besta deild karla, the top-tier men's football league in Iceland.

History
The association was founded in 1960. The men's division played in 1980 in the first Icelandic League (then Landsbankadeild) and managed the 2000 promotion again to the highest Icelandic league. In 2008 men's reached the summit and thus to play in Úrvalsdeild since 2009.

The club gained worldwide fame when their elaborate goal celebrations, including highly choreographed depictions of landing a fish, diving, a human toilet, a human bicycle, and a Rambo shooting spree, were published widely across the Internet and football television shows.

On October 4, 2014 Stjarnan won their first ever Úrvalsdeild karla title. Stjarnan went through the season unbeaten in the league and equalled the point record of 52 points.

In the 2014–15 Europa League, they reached the play-off rounds after beating Scottish club Motherwell and Polish team Lech Poznań, before Italian giants Inter Milan denied them a place in the group stages.

On 18 April 2019, Stjarnan won the Super Cup for the second time in its history, beating Valur 6-5 in penalties.

Current squad

Managers
 Ólafur Þór Guðbjörnsson (interim) (1 Jan 2010 – 31 Dec 2010)
 Bjarni Jóhannsson (1 Jan 2010 – 31 Dec 2012)
 Logi Ólafsson (1 Jan 2013 – 16 Oct 2013)
 Rúnar Páll Sigmundsson (1 Jan 2014 – 6 May 2021)
 Þorvaldur Örlygsson  (6 May 2021 – )

Honours 
Úrvalsdeild karla
 Champions: 2014
 Runners-up: 2016

1. deild karla
 Champions: 1989

Icelandic Cup
 Champions: 2018
 Runners-up: 2012, 2013

Icelandic Super Cup
 Champions: 2015, 2019

European record

Notes
 1Q: First qualifying round
 2Q: Second qualifying round
 3Q: Third qualifying round
 PO: Play-off round

References

External links
   

Football clubs in Iceland
Association football clubs established in 1960
1960 establishments in Iceland